U Mobile Sdn Bhd (223969-U) is a Malaysian mobile telecommunications service provider and was founded in 1998 as MiTV Networks Sdn Bhd. U Mobile is a wholly owned subsidiary of U Television Sdn Bhd, which was formerly known as U Telecom Media Holdings Sdn Bhd and MiTV Corporation Sdn Bhd.

The company utilises the 018 and 011 prefix allocated to the organisation by the Malaysian Communications and Multimedia Commission (MCMC), although with the implementation of mobile number portability mandated by the Malaysian government this does not apply to subscribers who switched from their old mobile service provider over to U Mobile.

Coverage, Products and Services 
U Mobile operate 4G LTE and 4G LTE-A networks.

As of 2015, U Mobile claimed to have 95% population coverage from a combination of over 10,000 sites of 3G and 4G LTE own-built, 3G RAN share and 2G Domestic Roaming with Maxis.

3G RAN share is collaborated with Maxis Communications since October 2011 but ended on 27 October 2018 due to U Mobile awarded two additional spectrum of 2x15MHz of 1800 MHz bands and 2x5MHz of 900 MHz bands that were awarded by the government on 2016.

Subscribers 
As of January 2021, U Mobile has more than 7 million subscribers.

Corporate history 
In April 2007, U Television Sdn Bhd signed the country's first nationwide domestic roaming memorandum of understanding, which led to an agreement with the mobile network operator Celcom Axiata Bhd allowing U Mobile's customers nationwide coverage while U Mobile rolled out its own high-speed mobile 3G service nationwide. The agreement was completed in June 2007.

In December 2007, the 3G communications operators KT Freetel and NTT DoCoMo jointly invested US$200 million (est. RM669 million) for a total of 33% stake in U Mobile.

In March 2008, U Mobile launched its first publicly available product called "Surf with U", a data-only plan for mobile users provided using U Mobile's HSDPA-driven mobile network. The following month, it rolled out its first mobile service, the postpaid U38 plan. In July, U Mobile launched two new postpaid services, U68 and U98, and the 018 Prepaid service.

In 2009, KT Freetel, one of U Mobile's foreign investors, sold its 16.5% stake (62.6 million shares) to U Mobile's major shareholder.

In November 2012, U Mobile activated 3G RAN Sharing with Maxis and transitioned its 2G network provider from Celcom to Maxis.

On 31 August 2013, U Mobile announced that En. Jaffa Sany Bin Md Ariffin has been terminated as the chief executive officer and ceased to be an employee of U Mobile due to disciplinary action. Accordingly, he is not authorised to act for and on behalf of the company in respect of any matter with immediate effect. He was appointed as chief executive officer of U Mobile on 1 June 2012.

On 17 December 2013, U Mobile launched its LTE network on the 2600 MHz band that covers the Klang Valley. U Mobile has currently about 2 million subscribers at the end of 2014.

On 1 April 2014, U Mobile announced the appointment of Wong Heang Tuck as chief executive officer (CEO) effective 1 April 2014, Jasmine Lee as chief marketing officer (CMO), and Alex Tan as chief sales officer (CSO) effective 1 January 2014

On 21 December 2015, U Mobile announced that D.Y.M.M. Sultan Ibrahim Ismail Ibni Almarhum Sultan Iskandar Al-Haj (“DYMM Sultan Ibrahim”) has acquired a further 5% stake in the company to increase his stake to 15%. DYMM Sultan Ibrahim acquired his initial 10% stake in U Mobile in 2014.

In February 2016, U Mobile confirms that it has been allocated with 15 years spectrum assignment of 2x5MHz of 900 MHz and 2x15MHz of 1800 MHz for full nationwide implementation starting 1 January 2017.

In March 2016, U Mobile announced that it has partnered with Football Malaysia Limited Liability Partnership (FMLLP) to be the Official Co-Sponsor of the Superbest Power Piala FA and Liga Premier Malaysia for three years, starting from the 2016 season. U Mobile will be the Exclusive Telecommunications Partner for the two premier football competitions. The partnership with FMLLP will give U Mobile marketing, promotion and engagement opportunities around the two competitions, in-stadium branding, corporate hospitality and use of the club and player image rights for advertising purposes.

On 26 May 2016, U Mobile become the first carrier in Malaysia to support Wi-Fi calling, initially only supporting iPhone owners owning iPhone 5c or later running iOS 9.3 and above. Wi-Fi calling for Android users are only supported on selected devices.

In August 2016, U Mobile launched its first 4G LTE Advanced network at Kota Belud, Sabah.

On 28 June 2017, U Mobile is terminating its 3G network sharing and alliance agreement with Maxis Bhd which was signed in 2011. Maxis said on Wednesday the termination would take place in stages over 18 months and the completion date is on 27 December 2018.
2G network RAN with Maxis is still in operation but since 2020 the maxis 2G operation is transitioned from maxis to celcom network provider and now 2G service already run on celcom

Stakeholders
The major shareholder of U Mobile includes Straits Mobile Investments Pte. Ltd (49%), followed by U Telemedia Sdn Bhd (21.46%), DYMM Sultan Ibrahim (15%), Magnum Berhad (6.33%), Tan Sri Vincent Tan Chee Yioun (6.2%), and Berjaya Infrastructure Sdn Bhd (2.01%).

5G
KUALA LUMPUR (Oct 18): 5G network coverage in Malaysia reached 33.2% of populated areas as of Sept 30, and is on track to achieve the 80% target set by the government by 2024, said the Malaysian Communications and Multimedia Commission (MCMC).18 Oct 2022

Partners
U Mobile's partners include:
 Atos Origin: Integrator of the BSCS iX Release 2 Billing System.
 Ericsson: High-Speed Packet Access (HSPA) solutions and management provider.
 Huawei: Telecommunication equipment provider, from access layers to core transmissions.
 LHS: Supplier of the BSCS iX Release 2 Billing System.
 Nokia Siemens Networks: Implementation, integration, and application development of DVB-H services, including the maintenance of MiTV's infrastructure on a turnkey basis.
 Rohde & Schwarz Malaysia: Supplier of low, medium and high powered digital television transmitters for the rollout implementation and coverage expansion of U Mobile's Mobile LiveTV.
 Telekom Malaysia: Provisioning of backhaul connectivity services through TM Next-Gen Backhaul (NGBH) services.
 ZTE: Telecommunication equipment provider.
 Whale Cloud: Cloud BSS solution Provider.

References

1998 establishments in Malaysia
Mobile phone companies of Malaysia
Internet service providers of Malaysia
Companies based in Kuala Lumpur
Telecommunications companies established in 1998
Malaysian brands
Privately held companies of Malaysia